Kingdom Story Company (formerly known as Kingdom Studios), is an American film and television studio in partnership with Lionsgate specializing in the production of Christian films. It was founded in 2018 by the Erwin Brothers (Jon and Andrew Erwin), Kevin Downes, and Tony Young and has operations in Nashville, Tennessee and Los Angeles, California.

History
Kingdom was funded by profits from the Erwins' film I Can Only Imagine, which was released in early 2018 by Lionsgate, grossing more than $83 million at the domestic box office on a $7 million budget. Subsequent negotiations with Lionsgate culminated in a multi-year deal in which it was agreed that the Erwin Brothers and Kevin Downes would create faith-based feature films and television programming for the company. Lionsgate Motion Picture Group Chairman, Joe Drake, and Television Group Chairman, Kevin Beggs announced the agreement on August 9, 2018.

Kingdom Story Company was announced to have been launched on March 26, 2019 at the National Religious Broadcasters convention in Anaheim, California.

I Still Believe, Kingdom's first film project, began filming in the spring of 2019 and was released on March 13, 2020.

In September 2019, it was announced that Kingdom would be launching a television division, headed by The Big Bang Theory producer Mona Garcea.

After Kingdom acquired the film rights to NFL quarterback Kurt Warner's life story, interviews, and memoir, American Underdog: The Kurt Warner Story was announced in February 2020, and released on December 25, 2021.

Films
Kingdom Story Company intends to produce two faith-based films per year, and has of yet revealed four productions, each one slated for a prospective 2020 or 2021 wide release by Lionsgate. Each of the films were unveiled at the National Religious Broadcasters convention at Anaheim, California  in March 2019.

I Still Believe is a biographical film on the life of Christian music artist Jeremy Camp during his first wife's struggle with cancer, and will be Kingdom's first film to be theatrically released. The other films announced are Apostles: Resurrection of Christ, which is to be the first in a trilogy based on the New Testament, Jesus Revolution, which is based on the events surrounding the Jesus Movement, and The Drummer Boy, which will be produced in cooperation with Christian music group For King and Country. American Underdog: The Kurt Warner Story is to be a sports drama biopic based on the life of Kurt Warner.

Following is a list of Kingdom's planned films:

See also
Pure Flix
Affirm Films
Fox Faith
Lightworkers Media

External links
Website
IMDB

References

2018 establishments in Tennessee
Companies based in Nashville, Tennessee
Companies based in Los Angeles
Christian film production companies
American film studios
American companies established in 2018
Film production companies of the United States
2018 establishments in California